Bob Oblong may refer to:

 Bob Oblong, a character in the American animated television series The Oblongs
 Bob Oblong, a character in the Australian animated television series The Shapies